Bagindo Azizchan (September 30, 1910 – July 19, 1947), was an Indonesian independence fighter and second Mayor of Padang after independence, inaugurated on August 15, 1946, replacing Abubakar Jaar. He died at the age of 36 after being involved in a battle against Dutch forces. His body was buried at the Bahagia Heroes Cemetery, Bukittinggi. On November 9, 2005, Bagindo Azizchan was declared a National Hero of Indonesia.

Profile

Early life and education 
Bagindo Aziz Chan was born in Kampung Alang Laweh, Padang on September 30, 1910. He is the fourth of six children, from the marriage of Bagindo Montok and Djamilah.

Bagindo Aziz Chan studied at a Hollandsch-Inlandsche School in Padang, Meer Uitgebreid Lager Onderwijs in Surabaya, and Algemene Middelbare School in Batavia. He spent two years at Rechtshoogeschool te Batavia (RHS) and opened a law practice. He was also active in several organizations, including as a board member of Jong Islamieten Bond under the leadership of Agus Salim.

Returning to his hometown in 1935, he served as a teacher in several schools in Padang and multiple moved to teach abroad. He was active in the Indonesian Muslim Association, Permi until the organization was dissolved in 1937.

Independence War 
After proclamation of independence, he was appointed Deputy Mayor of Padang on 24 January 1946 and on 15 August 1946 was appointed as mayor replacing Abubakar Jaar, who moved to become a resident in North Sumatra.

After the arrival of the Dutch and the allies in Padang on 10 October 1945, he refused to submit to Dutch forces. He continued to fight by writing in the newspaper Tjahaja Padang, even directly leading the resistance against the Dutch until he died on 19 July 1947. He made a public speech, "Step over my corpse first, then I'll hand over Padang".

According to the post-mortem carried out at Dr. Reksodiwiryo Army Hospital, Ganting, he died from being hit by a blunt object and three gunshots to the face.

Honors
To honor his service and sacrifice, Bagindo Aziz Chan's name was immortalized as a street name in several cities, such as Padang and Bukittinggi. In Padang, a fist-shaped monument was erected at the intersection of Jalan Gajah Mada and Jalan Jhoni Anwar, Olo Village, Nanggalo.  Although it was inaugurated as the Bagindo Aziz Chan Monument by the Mayor of Padang Syahrul Ujud on 19 July 1983, this monument and its intersection are better known as the Tugu Simpang Tinju.  Another monument, located at Taman Melati in the Museum Adityawarman complex, is the work of the painter Wisran Hadi and the sculptor Arby Samah.

References

National Heroes of Indonesia
1910 births
1947 deaths
Mayors of Padang
People from Padang
Minangkabau people
Mayors of places in Indonesia